Rogachevo (Russian: Рогачёво) is a settlement on Yuzhny Island, Novaya Zemlya, in Russia's Arkhangelsk Oblast. It lies approximately 8 kilometers (5.5 mi) northeast of Belushya Guba, and is home to Rogachevo Air Base. As of 2010, Rogachevo had a population of 457. In late 2014, Rogachevo was named as one of the points-based forces of the Joint Strategic Command "North". It is very cold. The people who live there fight to keep warm.

References

Novaya Zemlya
Populated places of Arctic Russia